Darr is a surname. Notable people with the surname include:

Adam Darr (1811–1866), German guitar and zither composer
Ann Darr (1920–2007), American poet
Leonard Darr (c.1554–1615), English politician
Leslie Rogers Darr (1886–1967), American judge
Lisa Darr (born 1963), American actress
Mike Darr (1976–2002), American baseball outfielder
Mike Darr (pitcher) (born 1956), American baseball pitcher
Robert Darr (born 1951), American author
Vondell Darr (1919–2012), American actress